KGIF may refer to:

 KGIF (FM), a radio station (88.1 FM) licensed to serve Tafuna, American Samoa
 Winter Haven's Gilbert Airport (ICAO code KGIF)